Niumalu is a district on the southeast coast of the island of Kauai in the Hawaiian Islands. It has a population of approximately 7,000 people. The Niumalu Beach Park is located within the district.

References

Geography of Kauai